The Original 16 Tour Bonspiel is an annual bonspiel, or curling tournament, that takes place at the Calgary Curling Club in Calgary, Alberta. The tournament is held in a round robin format. It was also a World Curling Tour event from 2012 to 2019.

Past champions
Only skip's name is displayed.

References

External links
Calgary Curling Club website

Sport in Calgary
Curling in Alberta